Tingel-Tangel is a 1930 German comedy film directed by Jaap Speyer and starring Elisabeth Pinajeff, Ernő Verebes, and Fritz Kampers.

The film's sets were designed by the art director Willi Herrmann and Herbert O. Phillips.

Cast

References

Bibliography

External links 
 

1930 films
1930 comedy films
German comedy films
Films of the Weimar Republic
1930s German-language films
Films directed by Jaap Speyer
German black-and-white films
1930s German films